Rawalpindi Division, also known as Pothohar/Pothwar Region locally, is an administrative division of Punjab Province, Pakistan. Rawalpindi city is the capital of the division. According to the 2017 Census of Pakistan, the total population of division was 10 million. Divisions are the third tier of government below the federal and provincial levels.

In 2000, local government reforms abolished administrative divisions and raised the districts to become the new third tier of government. But in 2008, the division system was restored again.

Districts 

It consists of the following districts:

History

British rule
Following the British conquest of the region in 1849, the area around Rawalpindi became a division of the Punjab province of British India, primarily because of the strategic location of the city of Rawalpindi.

The Imperial Gazetteer of India describes the division as follows:

"North-western Division of the Punjab, lying between 31°35' and 34° 1' N. and 70° 37' and 74°29' E. The Commissioner's headquarters are at Rawalpindi and Murree. The total population of the Division increased from 2,520,508 in 1881 to 2,750,713 in 1891, and to 2,799,360 in 1901. Its total area is 15,736 square miles, and the density of the population is 178 persons per square mile, compared with 209 for the Province as a whole"

The division was composed of four districts:

After independence

On independence in 1947, the division was one of four divisions of the province of West Punjab but from 1955 to 1970, the divisions was one of twelve (later thirteen) divisions of West Pakistan province under the One Unit policy. On the dissolution of West Pakistan, the division was restored to the new Punjab province, but parts of the division were transferred with parts of Lahore Division to form the new Gujranwala Division.

Demographics 
According to 2017 census, Rawalpindi division had a population of 10,006,624, which includes 4,999,414 males and 5,005,714 females. 
Rawalpindi division constitutes 1,154 Hindus, 9,871,675 Muslims, 126,049 Christians, 5,322 Ahmadi followed by 1,208 scheduled castes and 1,216 others.

See also 
 Divisions of Pakistan
 Divisions of Punjab, Pakistan
 Jhelum

References

Divisions of Punjab, Pakistan